Rainbow People is an album by trombonist Steve Turre recorded in 2007 and released on the HighNote label the following year.

Reception

The AllMusic review by Thom Jurek said the album "may be the finest offering of his career as a leader" and noted "his compositions here are startlingly fresh, wildly and cleverly inventive, and full of warmth and humor. His arrangements for this band are his new watermark".

On All About Jazz, Ian Patterson called it "a classy and deceptively leisurely session which finds Turre in sparkling form" and observed "The blues is at the heart of Rainbow People and the songs are like a heartfelt, mellow incantation—gospel praise to guiding lights. Classy, sophisticated, and soulful".

In JazzTimes, Bill Milkowski called it "a set of exhilarating originals and two well-chosen covers" and stated "In an age where young trombonists seem more attracted to the multiphonic experiments of players like Albert Mangelsdorff, Turre is decidedly old school, still out there waving the flag for bop elders like J.J. Johnson, Curtis Fuller and Slide Hampton".

Track listing 
All compositions by Steve Turre except where noted
 "Rainbow People" – 8:40
 "Forward Vision" – 5:59
 "Brother Ray" – 9:04
 "Groove Blues" – 5:51
 "Midnight in Madrid" – 8:47	
 "Cleopatra's Needle" (Steve Kirby) – 4:12
 "Search for Peace" (McCoy Tyner) – 8:15
 "Segment" (Charlie Parker) – 5:29
 "Para el Comandante" – 8:49

Personnel 
Steve Turre – trombone, shells
Kenny Garrett – alto saxophone, soprano saxophone  (tracks 1, 4, 8 & 9)
Sean Jones - trumpet, flugelhorn (tracks 2, 5 & 9) 
Mulgrew Miller – piano
Peter Washington - bass
Ignacio Berroa – drums
Pedro Martínez – percussion (track 9)

References 

Steve Turre albums
2008 albums
HighNote Records albums